Adela repetitella is a moth of the Adelidae family. It is found in most of Greece and Turkey.

References

Moths described in 1861
Adelidae
Moths of Europe
Moths of Asia